The 1926 United States Senate election in Pennsylvania was held on November 2, 1926. Incumbent Republican George W. Pepper, who was appointed following the death of Boies Penrose, was defeated for re-nomination by William Scott Vare. Vare won the election, defeating Democratic opponent William Bauchop Wilson. He was not permitted to assume office, however, until an investigation was conducted into possible election fraud and corruption. Vare was ultimately unseated in December 1929 by the Senate, following charges of corruption.

Despite Wilson's loss, this is the last time that the following counties have voted Democratic: Bradford, Cameron, Huntingdon, Lebanon, McKean, Perry, Potter, Snyder, Sullivan, Susquehanna, Tioga, Union, Wayne, and Wyoming.

Republican primary

Candidates
George W. Pepper, incumbent U.S. Senator
Gifford Pinchot, Governor of Pennsylvania and former Chief of the United States Forest Service
William Scott Vare, U.S. Representative from Philadelphia

Results

Democratic primary

Candidates
William Bauchop Wilson, former U.S. Secretary of Labor

Results

Prohibition primary

Candidates
Elisha Kent Kane
Gifford Pinchot, Governor of Pennsylvania and former Chief of the United States Forest Service

Results

Socialist primary

Candidates
Cora M. Bixler

Results

Labor primary

Candidates
George W. Pepper, incumbent U.S. Senator
Gifford Pinchot, Governor of Pennsylvania and former Chief of the United States Forest Service
William Scott Vare, U.S. Representative from Philadelphia

Results

General election

Results

Notes

References

1926
Pennsylvania
United States Senate